Sergei Mosyagin was a Soviet footballer and football coach.

In 1970s after winning the 1977 FIFA World Youth Championship, he was awarded honorary titles of Merited Coach of the Soviet Union and Merited Coach of the Russian SFSR (Russia).

External links
 Sergei Mosyagin at footballfacts.ru
 There passed away a Merited Coach of the Soviet Union Sergei Mosyagin (Скончался заслуженный тренер СССР Сергей Мосягин). Championat.com. 25 November 2011.

1937 births
2011 deaths
People from Ryazan Oblast
Soviet footballers
Soviet football managers
Merited Coaches of the Soviet Union
FC Izhevsk managers
Pakhtakor Tashkent FK managers
Expatriate football managers in the United Arab Emirates
Soviet expatriate football managers
Association football defenders
FC Dynamo Moscow reserves players
Sportspeople from Ryazan Oblast